Erika Morri (born 24 April 1971 Bologna) is an Italian company trainer, sports manager, coach and Italian rugby union player. She played in the  winger or center position. She played for the Italian national team with 19 appearances. She competed in two editions of the Rugby World Cup, and seven editions of the European championship.

She was an athletes' representative to the Italian Rugby Federation from 2016 to 2021, and a former member of the development committee for women's rugby in Rugby Europe. She won the 2019 Tina Anselmi Award.

Career 
She competed at the 1991 Women's Rugby World Cup, and 2002 Women's Rugby World Cup.

She played for Riviera del Brenta, and won an Italian championship in 2003-04.

She campaigned with the Women of Action Tour, and Loto Onlus.

References 

1971 births
Italian rugby union players
Living people
Sportspeople from Bologna